Streptostele is a genus of air-breathing land snails, terrestrial pulmonate gastropod mollusks in the subfamily Enneinae of the family Streptaxidae.

Distribution 
Indigenous distribution of the genus Streptostele include:
 Afrotropical: Uganda (4 described species, 2 undescribed species),...
 islands in the Gulf of Guinea
 the Seychelles
 Comoros
 Mascarenes

Species
Species within the genus Streptostele include:
 
 Streptostele abbreviata D. T. Holyoak, G. A. Holyoak & Sinclair, 2020
 Streptostele acicula (Morelet, 1877)
 Streptostele alluaudi Dautzenberg & Germain, 1914
 Streptostele angustior (Preston, 1911)
 Streptostele arambourgi Germain, 1934
 Streptostele auriformis Connolly, 1922
 Streptostele babaulti Germain, 1919
 Streptostele bacillum Pilsbry, 1919 
 Streptostele bequaerti Pilsbry, 1919
 Streptostele bequaertiana (Pilsbry, 1919)
 Streptostele buchholzi E. von Martens, 1876
 Streptostele candelula Connolly, 1922
 Streptostele centralis Pilsbry, 1919
 Streptostele cheranganiensis Germain, 1934
 Streptostele clara Connolly, 1922
 Streptostele clavulus Connolly, 1922
 Streptostele coloba Pilsbry, 1919 
 Streptostele columna Connolly, 1922
 Streptostele congoris Pilsbry, 1919
 Streptostele constricta Connolly, 1922
 Streptostele costulata E. von Martens, 1892
 Streptostele crassicrenulata Connolly, 1922
 Streptostele crassiplicata Connolly, 1922
 Streptostele crenulata (E.A. Smith, 1901)
 Streptostele curvata Connolly, 1922
 Streptostele curvicolumella (Connolly, 1922)
 Streptostele cylindrica Connolly, 1922
 Streptostele decaryi (Fischer-Piette, Blanc, F. & Vukadinovic, 1974)
 Streptostele elegans (Dautzenberg & Germain, 1914)
 Streptostele elgonensis Connolly, 1922
 Streptostele elongata Connolly, 1922
 Streptostele exasperata  Preston, 1912
 Streptostele fallooni Connolly, 1922
 Streptostele fastigiata (Morelet, 1848)
 Streptostele feai Germain, 1912
 Streptostele folini (Morelet, 1858)
 Streptostele hasta Connolly, 1922
 Streptostele herma Connolly, 1912
 Streptostele horei E. A. Smith, 1890 
 Streptostele inconspicua van Bruggen, 1964
 Streptostele iota Connolly, 1922
 Streptostele jaeckeli Venmans, 1959
 Streptostele jeanneli Germain, 1934
 Streptostele jod Connolly, 1922
 Streptostele kenyana Connolly, 1922
 Streptostele kilimanjaroensis Blume, 1965
 Streptostele klemmi Blume, 1959
 Streptostele langi Pilsbry, 1919
 Streptostele lenta (E. A. Smith, 1903)
 Streptostele leopoldvillensis Pilsbry, 1919
 Streptostele leroii (C. R. Boettger, 1915)
 Streptostele lessensis (Pilsbry, 1919)
 Streptostele limpida (E. von Martens, 1897)
 Streptostele milneedwardsi (Bourguignat, 1883)
 Streptostele minor E. von Martens, 1897
 Streptostele modelli Blume, 1952
 Streptostele monotropha (Germain, 1934)
 Streptostele moreletiana Dohrn, 1866
 Streptostele nitida Neubert, 2004
 Streptostele nyiroensis Connolly, 1922
 Streptostele ordinaria Connolly, 1922
 Streptostele oribates Connolly, 1922
 Streptostele osculum Connolly, 1922
 Streptostele patruelis Connolly, 1922
 Streptostele polymorpha  Preston, 1912
 Streptostele rutshuruensis (Pilsbry, 1919)
 Streptostele sanctuarii van Bruggen, 1966
 Streptostele scotti Connolly, 1941
 Streptostele signata Connolly, 1922
 Streptostele simplex E. A. Smith, 1890
 Streptostele sinuilabiata Connolly, 1922
 Streptostele streptosteloides (E. von Martens, 1897)
 Streptostele subangusta E. von Martens, 1891
 Streptostele subvaricosa (E. von Martens, 1897)
 Streptostele suradensis Connolly, 1931
 Streptostele terebra (Preston, 1911)
 Streptostele teres Pilsbry, 1919 
 Streptostele truncata Germain, 1915
 Streptostele unidentata Connolly, 1922
 Streptostele urguessensis Connolly, 1922
 Streptostele validor Connolly, 1922
 Streptostele varicosa (d'Ailly, 1910)
 Streptostele venusta (E. A. Smith, 1903)
 Streptostele vicina (Preston, 1911)
 Streptostele vitroni Fischer-Piette, C. P. Blanc, F. Blanc & F. Salvat, 1994
 Streptostele zambiensis Pilsbry, 1919

subgenus ?
 "Streptostele (Streptostele) species A" from Uganda
 "Streptostele (Streptostele) species B" from Uganda

Synonyms
 Streptostele bonjongoensis Tryon, 1885: synonym of Rhabdogulella buchholzi (E. von Martens, 1876) (unnecessary, unused replacement name)
 Streptostele dautzenbergi Pilsbry, 1919: synonym of Streptostele minor E. von Martens, 1897 (junior synonym)
 Streptostele insignis (E. A. Smith, 1898): synonym of Streptostele musaecola (Morelet, 1860): synonym of Tomostele musaecola (Morelet, 1860) (junior synonym)
 Streptostele lucida (J. S. Gibbons, 1879): synonym of Streptostele bawriensis (Pilsbry, 1905) (junior secondary homonym replaced by Opeas bawriense Pilsbry, 1905)
 Streptostele maheensis Connolly, 1925: synonym of Streptostele acicula (Morelet, 1877) (junior synonym)
 Streptostele meridionalis van Bruggen, 1966: synonym of Streptostele herma Connolly, 1912 (junior synonym)
 Streptostele musaecola (Morelet, 1860): synonym of Tomostele musaecola (Morelet, 1860)
 Streptostele roccatii (Pollonera, 1906): synonym of Primigulella linguifera (E. von Martens, 1895)

References

 Thiele, J. (1911). Mollusken der deutschen Zentral-Afrika-Expedition. Wissenschaftliche Ergebnisse der deutschen Zentral-Afrika-Expedition, 1907–1908. Band III, Zoologie I. Leipzig: Klinkhardt & Biermann. Pp. 175–214.
 Holyoak, D. T.; Holyoak, G. A.; Lima, R. F. D.; Panisi, M.; Sinclair, F. (2020). A checklist of the land Mollusca (Gastropoda) of the islands of São Tomé and Príncipe, with new records and descriptions of new taxa. Iberus: Revista de la Sociedad Española de Malacología, (Iberus).38(2): 219–319.

External links
 Smith, E. A. (1890). On a new genus and some new species of shells from Lake Tanganyika. Annals and Magazine of Natural History. ser. 6, 6: 93-96
 Boettger, C. R. & Haas, F. (1915). Beiträge zur Molluskenfauna des Sudans. Zoologische Jahrbücher, Abteilung für Systematik, Geographie und Biologie der Tiere.

Streptaxidae